Salem Al-Omzae is a Yemeni football forward who currently plays for Al-Tilal SC.

International career
Al-Omzae was part of the Yemeni squad at the 2019 AFC Asian Cup.

References

1992 births
Living people
Yemeni footballers
Yemen international footballers
Hassan Abyan players
Al-Tilal SC players
Yemeni League players
2019 AFC Asian Cup players
Association football forwards